They Bleed Red is the second studio album by American metalcore band Devil You Know. It was released on November 6, 2015, through Nuclear Blast Records. The band released the single "Stay of Execution" on September 10, 2015, to promote the album along with its announcement. A second single was released on October 5 called "The Way We Die". This is the band's final studio album to be released under the Devil You Know moniker before the band formally changed their name to Light the Torch and final album to feature John Sankey.

Track listing

Personnel
Devil You Know
 Howard Jones – lead vocals
 Francesco Artusato – guitar
 John Sankey – drums, percussion
 Ryan Wombacher – bass guitar, vocals

References 

Devil You Know (band) albums